The 1992–94 FIRA Trophy was the 30th edition of the European rugby union championship for national teams. The 1992-94 edition was arranged with a new format. Ten teams were admitted to the first division and divided into 2 pools to play a Preliminary Tournament which qualified five teams to play for the title in the 1993-1994 season.

Preliminary Tournament 

Five teams qualified to play in the pool for the "Title":
 
 
 
 
 

And five in the pool for the "Plate":

Pool for Title 
Italy came close to winning their first tournament, beating a non-capped France A1 side for the first time by 16-9, but lost to Romania (26-12) away, and so France won the title on points difference, despite finishing with the same number of table points as the Italian and the Romanian sides. The French only awarded caps in their first game, a 51-0 win over the Romanians. Russia participated for the first time after the end of the Soviet Union, finishing in a disappointing 4th place, with a single win over Spain abroad (16-9).

Pool for Sixth place

Second Division

Pool A

Pool B

Third Division

Pool A

Pool B 

 Moldova-Denmark not played

References

Bibliography 
 Francesco Volpe, Valerio Vecchiarelli (2000), 2000 Italia in Meta, Storia della nazionale italiana di rugby dagli albori al Sei Nazioni, GS Editore (2000) .
 Francesco Volpe, Paolo Pacitti (Author), Rugby 2000, GTE Gruppo Editorale (1999).

External links
1992-94 FIRA Trophy at ESPN

1992-94
1992–93 in European rugby union
1993–94 in European rugby union
1992 rugby union tournaments for national teams
1993 rugby union tournaments for national teams
1994 rugby union tournaments for national teams